Zale or Zales may refer to:

Places
Żałe, Kuyavian-Pomeranian Voivodeship, north-central Poland
Żale, Podlaskie Voivodeship, north-east Poland
Żale, Greater Poland Voivodeship, west-central Poland
Zaleś, Siedlce County, Masovian Voivodeship, east-central Poland
Zaleś, Sokołów County, Masovian Voivodeship, east-central Poland

People
Kārlis Zāle (1888–1942), Latvian sculptor
Tony Zale (1913–1997), American boxer
Zale Dalen (born 1947), Canadian film and television director
Zales Ecton (1898–1961), American politician 
Zale Parry (born 1933), American scuba diver and photographer

Other uses
Zale (band), a Romanian hip-hop group
Zale (moth), a genus of noctuid moths
Žale, a cemetery in Ljubljana, Slovenia
Zale Corporation, a retail jewelry chain commonly referred to as "Zales"
Zelmo Zale, a fictional character on the TV series M*A*S*H

See also
Zahle, a city in Lebanon